The following events occurred in July 1954:

July 1, 1954 (Thursday)
Japan's National Security Board is reorganized as the Defense Agency, and the Japan Self-Defense Forces are established.
The Nordic Passport Union is extended to allow citizens of the union to live and work in any of the four countries without a residence or work permit.
A North American X-10 plane, GM-19308, c/n 2, on Navaho X-10 flight number 7, develops a fire on board, crashes and burns eight minutes out of Edwards AFB, California.
The United States officially begins using the international unit of the nautical mile, equal to 6,076.11549 ft. or 1,852 metres.
Two men are killed when a United States Army plane crashes during a Reserve Officer Training Corps training flight at Kelly Air Force Base, Texas. One of the dead men is John McBride, a promising University of Alabama American football player.
Died: Thea von Harbou, German actress (b. 1888)

July 2, 1954 (Friday)
A ballot of Welsh local authorities, carried out by the South Wales Daily News, reveals a preference for Cardiff as the official capital of Wales.

July 3, 1954 (Saturday)
Following the death of Nebraska Senator Hugh Butler two days earlier, Samuel W. Reynolds is appointed by Governor Robert B. Crosby to the United States Senate to fill the open seat. Reynolds' career would be short as he chose to return to his wholesale coal business when elections took place in November 1954.
Died: Reginald Marsh, 56, US artist

July 4, 1954 (Sunday)
Food rationing in Great Britain ends with the lifting of restrictions on sale and purchase of meat, 14 years after it began early in World War II and nearly a decade after the war's end.
“Miracle of Bern”: West Germany beats Hungary 3–2 at the Wankdorf Stadium in Bern, Switzerland, to win the 1954 FIFA World Cup.

July 5, 1954 (Monday)
The Andhra Pradesh High Court is officially inaugurated in India, by the country's Home Minister, Kailash Nath Katju.
The BBC broadcasts the UK's first television news bulletin.
 Elvis Presley's first single, "That's All Right", is recorded by Sun Records in Memphis, Tennessee.
Born: Jimmy Crespo, US guitarist and songwriter, in Brooklyn, New York City; John Wright, New Zealand cricketer and coach, in Darfield, New Zealand

July 6, 1954 (Tuesday)
The Singapore-registered cargo ship Cherry Venture is driven aground in a storm at Teewah Beach, Australia, where it remains until scrapped in 2007. The captain and the crew of 24 people and two monkeys survive.
Died: Gabriel Pascal, Hungarian producer and director (b. 1894)

July 7, 1954 (Wednesday)
The Onslow by-election to the 30th New Zealand Parliament, caused by the death of Harry Combs, is rendered unnecessary in the absence of anyone having come forward by the closing date to oppose Labour candidate Henry May, who is declared elected.
 Dewey Phillips of WHBQ (AM) in Memphis is the first radio announcer to broadcast a recording of Elvis Presley. The track "That's All Right" (later pressed as Sun 209) was recorded two days earlier. Upon hearing that his debut record was about to be aired, Presley hid in a movie theater, thinking he would become a laughingstock.

July 8, 1954 (Thursday)
Died: George Gardiner (or Gardner), 77, Irish boxer, first undisputed World Light Heavyweight Champion

July 9, 1954 (Friday)
After two years' study of problems that might be encountered in human spaceflight, a joint group - NACA, Air Force, and Navy - meets in Washington, D.C., to discuss the need for a hypersonic research vehicle and to decide on the type of aircraft that could attain these objectives. The NACA proposal was accepted in December 1954, and a formal memorandum of understanding was signed to initiate the X-15 project. Technical direction of the project was assigned to the NACA.
Born: Kevin O'Leary, Canadian entrepreneur

July 10, 1954 (Saturday)
23-year-old Peter Thomson wins the British Open golf championship, becoming the first Australian to do so.
Born:  Neil Tennant, British singer-songwriter and record producer, in North Shields; Yō Yoshimura, Japanese voice actor (d. 1991)

July 11, 1954 (Sunday)
Died: Henry Valentine Knaggs, English physician and author (b. 1859)

July 12, 1954 (Monday)
The Panamanian cargo ship San Mardeno runs aground and sinks off Saurashtra, India, resulting in the death of her captain. The remaining 42 crew members are rescued.

July 13, 1954 (Tuesday)
Born: Ray Bright, Australian cricketer, in Melbourne
Died:
Frida Kahlo, 47, Mexican painter
Irving Pichel, 63, US actor and director
Grantland Rice, 73, US sports writer

July 14, 1954 (Wednesday)
The first prototype of the Handley Page Victor bomber is lost when the tail becomes detached during a low-level pass over the runway at Cranfield, UK, causing the aircraft to crash with the loss of the crew.
Died: Jacinto Benavente, 87, Spanish writer and Nobel laureate; Jackie Saunders, 61, American silent screen actress (b. 1892)

July 15, 1954 (Thursday)
The maiden flight of the Boeing 367-80 (or Dash 80), prototype of the Boeing 707 series.

July 16, 1954 (Friday)
A partial lunar eclipse takes place.
Died: Henri Frankfort, 57, Dutch Egyptologist, archaeologist and orientalist; Herms Niel, 66, German composer

July 17, 1954 (Saturday)
The 1954 British Grand Prix is held at Silverstone and is won by Argentine driver José Froilán González.
Born: 
Angela Merkel, Chancellor of Germany, in Hamburg
 Edward Natapei, Vanuatuan politician, 6th Prime Minister of Vanuatu (d. 2015)
Died: Machine Gun Kelly (George Kelly Barnes), 59, US gangster (heart attack)

July 18, 1954 (Sunday)
France's prime minister, Pierre Mendès France, obtains an assurance from Chinese leader Zhou Enlai, that he will cease to support some of the Viet Minh claims, in the interests of achieving peace in Indochina.

July 19, 1954 (Monday)
 Release of Elvis Presley's first single, "That's All Right", by Sun Records in the United States.

July 20, 1954 (Tuesday)
The 1954 Geneva Conference ends after nearly two months, resulting in the partition of Vietnam.
Born: Dave Shaw, Australian commercial aviator and cave diver (d. 2005)

July 21, 1954 (Wednesday)
First Indochina War: The Geneva Conference sends French forces to the south, and Vietnamese forces to the north, of a ceasefire line, and calls for elections to decide the government for all of Vietnam by July 1956. Failure to abide by the terms of the agreement leads to the establishment de facto of regimes of North Vietnam and South Vietnam, and the Vietnam War.

July 22, 1954 (Thursday)

July 23, 1954 (Friday)

July 24, 1954 (Saturday)

July 25, 1954 (Sunday)
Born: Walter Payton, African-American football player (d. 1999)

July 26, 1954 (Monday)
A US Air Force pilot, Lieutenant Floyd C. Nugent, suffers a landing gear problem while flying a Vought F7U-3 Cutlass, so he aims the jet out to sea and ejects. The plane flies on for almost 30 minutes before ditching near the shore.
Born: Vitas Gerulaitis, US tennis player, in Brooklyn, New York (d. 1994)

July 27, 1954 (Tuesday)
The second Avro Vulcan prototype is badly damaged when it swings off the runway upon landing at Farnborough, UK.
Born: Lynne Frederick, British actress (d. 1994)

July 28, 1954 (Wednesday)
Born: Hugo Chávez, President of Venezuela, in Sabaneta (d. 2013); Gerd Faltings, German mathematician, in Buer
Died: Sōjin Kamiyama or "Sojin", Japanese film star during the American silent film era, (b. 1884)

July 29, 1954 (Thursday)
Tropical Storm Barbara makes landfall near Vermilion Bay, Louisiana, United States, causing some flooding and some damage to the local rice crop.
Died: Coen de Koning, 75, Dutch speed skater (b. 1879)

July 30, 1954 (Friday)
The Television Act 1954 receives Royal Assent, enabling the creation of a commercial television service in the UK.

July 31, 1954 (Saturday)
Italian expedition to K2: Italian mountaineers Lino Lacedelli and Achille Compagnoni become the first two people to reach the summit of the second highest mountain in the world.
The Patea by-election to the 30th New Zealand Parliament, brought about by the resignation of William Sheat, results in Sheat being re-elected as an Independent candidate.

References

1954
1954-07
1954-07